The Richmond Relief Society Hall is a historic building in Richmond, Utah. It was built during 1880 to 1882 for the local chapter of the Relief Society of the Church of Jesus Christ of Latter-day Saints. It has been listed on the National Register of Historic Places since June 7, 1996.

It is a "modest" building; it was labeled "Victorian" in style in its National Register nomination, but no Victorian features are identified.

It was deemed notable as "one [of] the oldest known original Relief Society Halls existing in Utah." It served as a Relief Society building until 1904, then used as a schoolhouse until around 1919.  It was purchased by the Daughters of the Utah Pioneers in 1919 and served as the DUP's meeting place until 1959.  In 1996 it was under renovation for it to serve as a museum and again as a DUP meeting place.

References

	
National Register of Historic Places in Cache County, Utah
Buildings and structures completed in 1880
1880 establishments in Utah Territory
19th-century Latter Day Saint church buildings
Relief Society buildings